The Abens is a river in Bavaria, Germany, and a right-bank tributary of the Danube. Its source is near Au in der Hallertau. It empties into the Danube at Eining, part of Neustadt an der Donau.

References

Rivers of Bavaria
Tributaries of the Danube
Freising (district)
Kelheim (district)
Pfaffenhofen (district)
Rivers of Germany